Valeriu Perdivara (born 8 February 1971) is a Romanian judoka.

Achievements

See also
European Judo Championships
History of martial arts
List of judo techniques
List of judoka
Martial arts timeline

References

External links

1971 births
Living people
Romanian male judoka
Place of birth missing (living people)